The Pass System is a 2015 Canadian documentary film about the pass system, a former Canadian government policy in which the First Nations were kept segregated on their reserves.

The film was researched, directed, and produced by Alex Williams and narrated by Tantoo Cardinal. Its executive producer was James Cullingham, and it had music by Cris Derksen.

The film was made with support from the Canada Council for the Arts, the Ontario Arts Council, the Toronto Arts Council and the community, and was produced in association with Tamarack Productions. It premiered in Vancouver, British Columbia, during the 2015 Vancouver International Film Festival. The film was first broadcast by the Aboriginal Peoples Television Network on April 13, 2016 and was shown by the main network of the Canadian Broadcasting Corporation on June 19, 2016 at 1 p.m.

References

External links

2015 films
Canadian documentary films
Documentary films about racism in Canada
2015 documentary films
Documentary films about First Nations
2010s Canadian films